The Rooney River is a river in southern Fiordland, New Zealand. It rises in the Kaherekoau Mountains and flows southward into Lake Hauroko.

See also
List of rivers of New Zealand

References

Rivers of Fiordland